Autódromo Luis Rubén Di Palma is a  motorsports circuit located in Mar de Ajó, Argentina. The circuit was inaugurated on 8 February 1998 with Turismo Carretera race, and it was named in honour of Luis Rubén Di Palma. The circuit has hosted mainly national championships. But it has also hosted some continental championship events, Formula 3 Sudamericana in 2001, and South American Super Touring Car Championship in 1998.

Lap records 

The official fastest race lap records at the Autódromo Luis Rubén Di Palma are listed as:

References

Motorsport venues in Buenos Aires Province